Bass Strike, often stylized as BASS Strike, is a fishing video game for the PlayStation 2 platform, released in 2001.

Reception

The game received "mixed" reviews according to the review aggregation website Metacritic. In Japan, where the game was ported and published by Capcom on February 14, 2002, Famitsu gave it a score of 26 out of 40.

References

External links
 

2001 video games
Capcom games
Fishing video games
PlayStation 2 games
PlayStation 2-only games
THQ games